Monico is an unincorporated community located in the town of Monico, Oneida County, Wisconsin, United States.

Images

References

External links

Unincorporated communities in Oneida County, Wisconsin
Unincorporated communities in Wisconsin